Edward Wade (born 29 September 1901, date of death unknown) was an English professional association footballer who played as an inside forward. He started his career with Burnley, but failed to make an appearance for the club and left at the end of the 1922–23 season. In the summer of 1924, he joined Football League Third Division North side New Brighton, where he scored 24 goals in 72 league games over a four-year period. At the start of the 1928–29 season, he signed for Third Division South outfit Exeter City, where he played nine matches, scoring five league goals. He left Exeter City in 1929, and subsequently had a spell in non-league football with Aldershot.

References

1901 births
Sportspeople from Blackpool
English footballers
Association football forwards
Burnley F.C. players
New Brighton A.F.C. players
Exeter City F.C. players
Aldershot F.C. players
English Football League players
Year of death missing